Cheeseburger is an American hard rock band. They are perhaps best known for their song "Commin' Home", which was used as the theme song for the Adult Swim animated television series Superjail!, which was co-created by the band's guitarist, Christy Karacas, who is also known for creating Ballmastrz: 9009.

Spin has referred to the band as "The Hives, minus the Swedish accents (and matching formalwear)".

Gang's All Here
On June 10, 2005, Cheeseburger's released the 6 song EP "Gang's All Here" on Kemado Records.

Self-titled LP
Their first album, the self-titled "Cheeseburger" was released in 2007.

Another Big Night Down The Drain
In March 2011, the band announced it would release its second album Another Big Night Down The Drain on May 3 of the same year from Williams Street Records, Adult Swim's independent music label. Original band members Bradley, Crotty and Karacas are now joined by Jayson Green (vocals), Christian Gordy (bass) and Eric Dufresne (guitar) on the release. To support the album's release, Cheeseburger performed in Austin, TX at the 2011 South by Southwest festival.

It was also announced that a lot of the music from the second album would be featured all throughout the upcoming season of Superjail!.

Other media

Along with performing the theme song for Superjail!, Cheeseburger is also well known for their work on video games and movies. Their song "Cocaine" is on the Radio Broker station in the video game Grand Theft Auto IV, "Comin Home" was featured on the soundtrack of the video game Skate 3, "Winner" was used in Saints Row: The Third and their song "Derby Day" was included in the closing credits of the movie Step Brothers.

Guitarist Christy Karacas studied film and animation at the Rhode Island School of Design.

Discography
2007: Cheeseburger
2011: Another Big Night Down The Drain

References

External links
Official Myspace page
[ Allmusic.com bio]

Musical groups from New York (state)